Lorain County is a county in the northeastern part of the U.S. state of Ohio. As of the 2020 census, the population was 312,964. Its county seat is Elyria. The county was physically established in 1822, becoming judicially independent in 1824. Lorain County is part of the Cleveland-Elyria, OH Metropolitan Statistical Area. The county is home to Oberlin College.

History
Lorain County was established in 1822 from portions of several of its adjacent counties. This county became judicially-independent in 1824. The original proposed name for the county was "Colerain". The final name "Lorain" was chosen by Heman Ely, who had previously founded and named the city of Elyria. The county's name was based on the French province of Lorraine.

Geography
It is Ohio's fourth-largest county by area.

Adjacent counties
 Cuyahoga County (east)
 Medina County (southeast)
 Ashland County (south)
 Huron County (southwest)
 Erie County (northwest)

Major highways

  Interstate 80 (Ohio Turnpike)
  Interstate 90 (Ohio Turnpike)
  Interstate 480
  U.S. Route 6
  U.S. Route 20
  State Route 2
  State Route 10
  State Route 18
  State Route 57
  State Route 58
  Ohio Route 82
  Ohio Route 83
  State Route 113
  Ohio Route 162
  Ohio Route 254
  Ohio Route 301
  Ohio Route 303
  Ohio Route 511
  Ohio Route 611

Demographics

As of the 2010 census, there were 301,356 people, 116,274 households, and 80,077 families residing in the county. The racial makeup of the county was 84.8% white, 8.6% black or African American, 0.9% Asian, 0.3% American Indian, 2.5% from other races, and 3.0% from two or more races. Those of Hispanic or Latino origin made up 8.4% of the population. In terms of ancestry, 26.5% were German, 16.7% were Irish, 10.9% were English, 8.4% were Polish, 8.2% were Italian, 6.2% were American, and 5.2% were Hungarian.

Of the 116,274 households, 32.6% had children under the age of 18 living with them, 50.5% were married couples living together, 13.5% had a female householder with no husband present, 31.1% were non-families, and 26.0% of all households were made up of individuals. The average household size was 2.51 and the average family size was 3.02. The median age was 40.0 years.

The median income for a household in the county was $52,066 and the median income for a family was $62,082. Males had a median income of $49,146 versus $35,334 for females. The per capita income for the county was $25,002. About 10.3% of families and 13.1% of the population were below the poverty line, including 20.5% of those under age 18 and 8.0% of those age 65 or over.

Politics
Lorain County has primarily leaned Democratic in recent presidential elections. It has voted for the Democratic candidate for president in 12 of the last 16 elections, including every one from 1988 to 2016. In 2016, however, the county was almost swept up in the unexpected Republican surge in the Rust Belt; Donald Trump came within 131 votes of being the first Republican to capture the county since Ronald Reagan in 1984. Four years later, he flipped the county Republican by a narrow majority.

|}

Education

Higher education
 Lorain County Community College, Elyria
 Oberlin College, Oberlin

Public school districts
There are 20 public school districts in Lorain County. Those primarily in Lorain County are listed in bold. Each district's high school(s) and location is also listed.
 Amherst Exempted Village School District
 Amherst Marion L. Steele High School, Amherst
 Avon Local School District
 Avon High School, Avon
 Avon Lake City School District
 Avon Lake High School, Avon Lake
 Black River Local School District (also in Medina Co and Ashland Co.)
 Black River High School, Sullivan
 Clearview Local School District
 Clearview High School, Lorain
 Columbia Local School District
 Columbia High School, Columbia Station
 Elyria City School District
 Elyria High School, Elyria
 Firelands Local School District (also in Erie Co.)
 Firelands High School, Henrietta Twp (Oberlin)
 Keystone Local School District
 Keystone High School, LaGrange
 Lorain City School District
 Lorain High School, Lorain
 Mapleton Local School District (Primarily in Ashland Co.)
 Mapleton High School, Ashland
 Midview Local School District
 Midview High School, Eaton Twp (Grafton)
 New London Local School District (primarily in Huron Co.)
 New London High School, New London
 North Ridgeville City School District
 North Ridgeville High School, North Ridgeville
 Oberlin City School District
 Oberlin High School, Oberlin
 Olmsted Falls City Schools (primarily in Cuyahoga Co.)
 Olmsted Falls High School, Olmsted Falls
 Sheffield-Sheffield Lake City School District
 Brookside High School, Sheffield
 Strongsville City School District (primarily in Cuyahoga Co.)
 Strongsville High School, Strongsville
 Vermilion Local Schools (primarily in Erie Co.)
 Vermilion High School, Vermilion
 Wellington Exempted Village School District (also in Huron Co.)
 Wellington High School, Wellington

The county also includes the Lorain County Joint Vocational School District, which encompasses the entire county and serves students from the Amherst, Avon, Avon Lake, Clearview, Columbia, Elyria, Firelands, Keystone, Midview, North Ridgeville, Oberlin, Sheffield-Sheffield Lake and Wellington school districts from a 10-acre campus on a 100-acre site near the intersection of State Route 58 and U.S. Route 20 in Oberlin.

Private high schools
 Elyria Catholic High School, Elyria
 Lake Ridge Academy, North Ridgeville
 Open Door Christian School, Elyria
 Christian Community School, North Eaton
 First Baptist Christian School, Elyria

Communities

Cities

 Amherst
 Avon
 Avon Lake
 Elyria (county seat)
 Lorain
 North Ridgeville
 Oberlin
 Sheffield Lake
 Vermilion

Villages

 Grafton
 Kipton
 LaGrange
 Rochester
 Sheffield
 South Amherst
 Wellington

Townships

 Amherst
 Brighton
 Brownhelm
 Camden
 Carlisle
 Columbia
 Eaton
 Elyria
 Grafton
 Henrietta
 Huntington
 LaGrange
 New Russia
 Penfield
 Pittsfield
 Rochester
 Sheffield
 Wellington

https://web.archive.org/web/20160715023447/http://www.ohiotownships.org/township-websites

Census-designated places
 Eaton Estates
 Pheasant Run

Unincorporated communities
 Belden
 Brentwood Lake
 Brighton
 Columbia Hills Corners
 Columbia Station
 Henrietta
 North Eaton
 Pittsfield
 Whiskyville

See also
 National Register of Historic Places listings in Lorain County, Ohio
 USS Lorain County (LST-1177)

References

External links

 Lorain County Government's website
 Lorain County Sheriff's Office
 Lorain County Historical Society's website
 Lorain County History Project
 [chrome-extension://efaidnbmnnnibpcajpcglclefindmkaj/https://www.loraincountyohio.gov/DocumentCenter/View/1633/Commissioners-History?bidId=]

 
1824 establishments in Ohio
Populated places established in 1824